Lercaro is a surname of Italian origin. Notable people with this surname include:

 Catalina Lercaro (16th century), Italian-Canarian woman of the Lercaro family, a noble dynasty of Genoese merchants
 Giacomo Lercaro (1891–1976), Italian Roman Catholic Archbishop and Cardinal 

Surnames of Italian origin